EMMS (Emacs MultiMedia System) is media player software for Emacs. It is written in Emacs Lisp. The name could possibly echo XMMS. It may be derived from an earlier Emacs-based player called mp3-player.

EMMS may have multiple back ends to connect to external players so EMMS can support a few different audio and video formats, while remaining clean and small itself. EMMS is divided into three parts, the player back ends, media sources (which can be a local file system or a network stream), and the core player. One of the player back ends connects to MPD. Other backends are available for mplayer and gstreamer. Additional players can be easily defined.

EMMS implements a buffer-based playlist and queue. Locations in files can be bookmarked. Standard Emacs key bindings are used to navigate, edit the playlist, and control playback. Using Emacs server support, playlists can be built using a file manager such as ROX-Filer. EMMS supported scrobbling to Last.fm until version 4.0, when this service was replaced with the free software Libre.fm. There are many third-party scripts to enhance EMMS to provide pop-up notifications, lyric fetching, and binaural beat generation.

References

External links
 EMMS home
 Emacs wiki page
 Emacs in the real world

Emacs modes
Cross-platform free software
Free audio software
Free media players
Free software programmed in Lisp